Dimitrios Patapis (born 14 June 1996) is a Greek professional footballer who plays as a centre-back for Super League 2 club Apollon Smyrnis.

References

1996 births
Living people
Greek footballers
Super League Greece 2 players
Football League (Greece) players
Gamma Ethniki players
Panachaiki F.C. players
Association football defenders
Footballers from Patras